The University Church, or Universitätskirche, is a Catholic church at the University of Freiburg. Located on Bertoldstrasse amongst the university buildings, the former Jesuit church (Jesuitenkirche) has been part of the university since the 18th Century.

History 
The church was built between 1683 and 1701 according to the plans of the Jesuit architect Heinrich Mayer and was dedicated to the Immaculate Conception of the Virgin Mary. The statues to the left and right of the main portal depict Saint Aloysius Gonzaga and Saint Stanislaus Kostka.

After the abolition of the Society of Jesus (1773), the order and its buildings came into the university's possession in 1793. When the Archdiocese of Freiburg was created in 1827, the first archbishop, Bernard Boll, was ordained in this church.

The Church Today 
Today the church provides divine service for the community of the university. The church's organ and quality acoustics also ensure a high demand for its use as a concert venue, particularly for university organisations.

See also
 List of Jesuit sites

References 

Medicine
Freiburg University
Buildings and structures in Freiburg im Breisgau
Tourist attractions in Freiburg im Breisgau